Myles Lewis Thomas (October 22, 1897 – December 12, 1963) was an American right-handed pitcher in Major League Baseball. He was born in State College, Pennsylvania. He was nicknamed "Duck Eye" by Babe Ruth.

On April 18,  at the age of 28, he made his major league debut with the New York Yankees. On June 15, he was purchased from the Yankees by the Washington Senators. Overall, he went 23–22 with a 4.64 career ERA. As a batter, he hit a respectable (for a pitcher) .240. He had a career .955 fielding percentage. In the postseason, he had a 3.00 ERA in 2 games.

Thomas played his final game on June 21, . He died in Toledo, Ohio. His body is buried in Woodlawn Cemetery in Toledo.

1927: The Diary of Myles Thomas 

In 2016, ESPN announced 1927: The Diary of Myles Thomas, part a new genre of storytelling known as "real-time historical fiction." The core of the project is a historical novel in the form of a diary of Myles Thomas, written by Douglas Alden, complemented by a wealth of fact-based content from the season, all published along the same timeline as the events unfolded almost 90 years ago.
Through Myles Thomas’s diary entries, additional essays and real-time social-media components “re-living” that famous Yankees season, the goal is to explore the rarefied nexus of baseball, jazz and Prohibition — defining elements of the remarkable world that existed in 1927. The diary runs the length of the full 1927 season, from April 13 through October 10, 1927.

Facts 
Thomas wore the number 20 with the Yankees in 1929.
He earned $6,500 in 1927.

References

External links

Major League Baseball pitchers
Baseball players from Pennsylvania
New York Yankees players
Washington Senators (1901–1960) players
Toledo Mud Hens managers
Penn State Nittany Lions baseball players
1897 births
1963 deaths
Hartford Senators players
Reading Aces players
Toronto Maple Leafs (International League) players
Newark Bears (IL) players
Hollywood Stars players
St. Paul Saints (AA) players
Toledo Mud Hens players
Indianapolis Indians players